Maná MTV Unplugged is a live album by Mexican rock band Maná. It was an accoustic set performed for MTV Unplugged in Miami on March 9, 1999, and released on CD and DVD on June 22, 1999. It includes exclusive re-make versions of the José Alfredo Jiménez song "Te Solte La Rienda", the Rubén Blades song "Desapariciones", and "Se Me Olvidó Otra Vez" by Juan Gabriel. As of 2000, it sold 2 millions of copies.

It received a nomination for a Grammy Award for Best Latin Pop Album.

Track listing

Maná MTV Unplugged DVD

Maná MTV Unplugged was also released as a DVD. The DVD has the same song tracks as the CD, as well as two bonus music videos "Como Un Lobo Por Tu Amor" and "Me Vale".

The concert
Fher Olvera wears a T-shirt featuring the masked image of Mexican Zapatista leader Subcomandante Marcos.

DVD
MTV Unplugged
Jump to a song
The Making of...
Interviews
Internet
Video-Bonus
"Como Un Lobo Por Tu Amor" music video
"Me Vale" music video
Discography

The "Me Vale" video is a travelogue with many scenes of the band on tour, including their ride on the Maid of the Mist at Niagara Falls, New York.

Chart performance

Album

Sales and certifications

See also
1999 in Latin music
List of best-selling albums in Argentina
List of best-selling Latin albums in the United States
 List of best-selling Latin albums

References

Mtv Unplugged (Mana album)
Maná live albums
Maná video albums
Warner Music Latina live albums
1999 video albums
1999 live albums
Spanish-language live albums
Warner Music Latina video albums